Aldred's Case (1610) 9 Co Rep 57b; (1610) 77 ER 816, [1558–1774] All ER Rep 622, is an English land law and tort law case on nuisance. The case can be seen as the birth of the ordinary man having a cause of action in certain types of environmental law against his immediate neighbour. The case confirmed a legal right to abate relatively extreme noise and smell, provided it cannot be justified as being protected by way of an easement have arisen such as from the passing of time (an easement by prescription) or custom on the piece of land in question.

The judge recited the separate law, in an obiter dictum in an old Latin maxim in the English common law, that there is no right to a view.

William Aldred claimed that Thomas Benton had erected and used a pigsty too close to his house, so that the stench made his own house unbearable to live in, including the "stopping of wholesome air".

Judgment
The Court ruled that the smell of the sty was enough to deprive Aldred of his property and personal dignity and therefore a violation of his rights and his honour as it was stripped away from him, holding that a man has, "no right to maintain a structure upon his own land, which, by reason of disgusting smells, loud or unusual noises, thick smoke, noxious vapours, the jarring of machinery, or the unwarrantable collection of flies, renders the occupancy of adjoining property dangerous, intolerable, or even uncomfortable to its tenants..."

The Court also held the following.

See also
 Edward Coke
 Wheeler v JJ Saunders Ltd

External links
 Text of the Report from the 1826 edition

1610 in England
1610 in English law
1610s in the environment
Edward Coke cases
English land case law
English nuisance cases
English tort case law
Environmental case law
Environmental law in the United Kingdom
History of agriculture in England
Pig farming